Pang Panpan (born 7 June 1988 in  Shijiazhuang, Hebei) is a Chinese gymnast. She was a member of the 2006 World Champion Chinese team.

Career
Pang was selected for and started gymnastic training in 1997 when she was in primary school and so she entered the Shijiazhuang Amateur Sports School. In  January 2001, she  was selected by Huang Jian, the leader of the Hebei Gymnastics Team, to be a part of the team. After four months of joining the team, she took part in the Li Ning's Cup, a National Children's Gymnastics Competition in May 2001.  Towards the end of the year 2002, she was selected for the National Gymnastics Team. She reported for training on January 1, 2003.

Pang has competed at multiple World Cup events in the past, but her best overall performance up until that point was at the 2006 Foshan Chinese National Championships where she won the all-around and floor exercise titles.  This victory would earn her a spot to compete at the World Championships later that year, but her spot depended on her performance at the Xiantao Nationals in autumn.

Though her performance at the Xiantao Nationals was not as good at the first nationals, she was chosen for the World team.

At the 2006 Shanghai World Cup, she won the title on the beam with a score of 15.600 and on floor exercises with a score of 15.300.

On July 16, 2006, in Shanghai, China, Pang won the gold in the beam.

At the 2006 World Championships, Pang was a member of the Chinese team.  Pang fell on both the beam and the floor in preliminaries but did well on both of these events in team finals.  Pang was also called up for bars, on which she did exceptionally well, in last minute when Li Ya messed up her routine in the warm-up session.  She and her teammates Zhang Nan, Li Ya, Cheng Fei, Zhou Zhuoru, He Ning, and alternate Huang Lu made history as they became the first Chinese women's team to win a gold medal in the team event.

Pang went on to compete in the all-around where she finished 12th in preliminaries.  She was in the top three after the first rotation; but in the second rotation, she fell on her Yang Bo (a split jump with a back arch).   She continued onto floor exercise where she earned a 15.425; which put her into first place going into the last rotation. She performed a double-twisting Yurchenko, but landed low, took a step, and placed her hands on the mat, and got a 0.8 deduction.  She scored 14.025 and ended up in 6th place.

Bars was her weakest event overall but due to injury she was only trained consistently on this event during the run up to the selection of 2008 Beijing Olympics. By that time, He Kexin and Yang Yilin were making their presence known, and Pang’s bars weren’t enough.

Gymnastics skills
On floor exercise, she shows off her twisting capabilities and choreography. On the balance beam, she performs split jumps that arch more than the 180 degree requirement. She is also capable of the very difficult tucked barani (front somersault with a half turn).  On Uneven Bars, she has made some improvement with her lines and execution, being careful not to bend her arms on swings.  On this apparatus, she does a transition from the high bar to the low bar called the Ezhova] (named after a Russian gymnast) that is basically a layout barani.  On vault, she is capable of performing the double-twisting yurchenko that has a 5.8 A-score in the 2006 Code of Points.

Competitive history

2008 season

2007 season

2006 season

2005 season

References

External links
 
 15th Asian Games Artistic Gymnastics - gymnasticsresults.com
 Pang Panpan at gymbox.net

Living people
1988 births
Chinese female artistic gymnasts
Medalists at the World Artistic Gymnastics Championships
Gymnasts from Hebei
Sportspeople from Shijiazhuang
Asian Games medalists in gymnastics
Gymnasts at the 2006 Asian Games
Asian Games gold medalists for China
Asian Games silver medalists for China
Medalists at the 2006 Asian Games
Central University of Finance and Economics alumni